Diplomacy is an 1878 English play which is a translation and adaptation by B. C. Stephenson and Clement Scott of the 1877 French play Dora by Victorien Sardou.  It saw frequent revivals and was a popular play for over fifty years.

History

Sardou's original play debuted in Paris in January 1877, and was a success, making it ripe for "adaptation" into English.  B. C. Stephenson and Clement Scott had previously adapted the Sardou play Nos Intimes for the Bancrofts, under the name Peril to great success, and thus they were engaged to adapt Dora as well (with contributions by the Bancrofts) for use at the Princes of Wales Theatre. Diplomacy was described by the English theatrical paper The Era as "the great dramatic hit of the season".  From 12 January 1878 to 10 January 1879 it ran on a single bill and long held a record as the only English theatre production to stay unchanged for a year. A revival opening on 8 November 1884 by the Bancrofts at The Haymarket ran for another 117 performances.  Later English revivals occurred in 1893 at the Garrick, in 1913 (featuring Owen Nares and Gladys Cooper) at Wyndham's, in 1924 at the Adelphi, and at Prince's in 1933.

Diplomacy had its Broadway debut at Wallack's Theatre on 1 April 1878 and played until 15 June, the end of the season. It remained a favorite play whenever revived by the Wallack company. It saw Broadway revivals in 1892 at the Star Theatre, in 1901 at the Empire (produced by Charles Frohman, 56 perf.), a 1910 revival at Maxine Elliott's Theatre (33 perf.), another Frohman revival at the Empire in 1914 (63 perf.), and a 1928 revival at Erlanger's Theatre (40 perf.).

The Jitney Players touring company performed an updated version of the play by Ethel Barrymore in 1938.

Original London cast (1878)
John Clayton as Henry Beauclerc
William Hunter Kendal as Julian Beauclerc
Arthur Cecil as Baron Stein
Squire Bancroft as Count Orloff
Mr. Dean as Antoine
Madge Kendal as Dora
Effie Bancroft as Countess Zika
Roma Le Thiere as Marquise

Original Broadway cast (1878)
Lester Wallack as Henry Beauclerc
Henry James Montague as Captain Julian Beauclerc
Frederic Robinson at Count Orloff
W.R. Floyd as Algie Fairfax
J.W. Shannon as Baron Stein
W.J. Leonard as Markham
W.A. Eytange as Charven
C.E. Edwin as Sheppard
Herbert Ayling as Antoine
J. Peck as Francois
Rose Coghlan as Countess Zicka
Maude Granger as Dora
Madame Ponisi as Marquise de rio Zares
Pearl Eytinge as Mion

Adaptations
F.C. Burnand wrote an 1878 burlesque of the play called Dora and Diplunacy.

It was adapted to silent films in 1916 and 1926. A BBC radio version aired in June 1938.

References

External links
 
 

1878 plays
British plays adapted into films
Adaptations of works by Victorien Sardou